was a professional track cyclist, photographer, designer, and aquarist. His interest in aquaria led him to create the Japanese company Aqua Design Amano.

Amano was the author of Nature Aquarium World (TFH Publications, 1994), a three-book series on aquascaping and freshwater aquarium plants and fish. He has also published the book Aquarium Plant Paradise (TFH Publications, 1997).

A species of freshwater shrimp is named the "Amano shrimp" or "Yamato shrimp" (Caridina multidentata; previously Caridina japonica) after him. After discovering this species' ability to eat large quantities of algae, Amano asked a local distributor to special order several thousand of them. They have since become a staple in the freshwater planted aquarium hobby.

He also developed a line of aquarium components that are known as Aqua Design Amano (ADA). "Nature Aquarium", his article series, appeared in monthly magazines in Practical Fishkeeping in the UK, and Tropical Fish Hobbyist in the US. He died of pneumonia in 2015 at the age of 61.

Aquarist

Takashi Amano wrote about freshwater aquascaping. He established a distinctive style of plant layout. He employed Japanese gardening concepts such as wabi-sabi and Zen rock arrangements. His tank compositions sought to mimic nature in their appearance. Amano made extensive use of Glossostigma elatinoides and Riccia fluitans as plant material.

He founded Aqua Design Amano Co., Ltd. in 1982, providing aquatic plant-growing equipment. His photo books of what he called the "Nature Aquarium", Glass no Naka no Daishizen, published in 1992, followed by Mizu-Shizen eno kaiki, were translated into seven languages.

Amano shrimp

The Amano shrimp (Caridina multidentata) was introduced to the aquatic hobby by Takashi Amano as a means of controlling the growth of algae in the 1980s. The shrimp was therefore named after him.

Forests Underwater at Lisbon Oceanarium
This exhibit is one of Amano's major works. It features a tropical freshwater aquascape at the Lisbon Oceanarium. The exhibit was opened on April 21, 2015.

Photography career
Starting in 1975, Amano visited tropical rainforests in Amazon, Borneo, and West Africa and pristine forests in Japan, creating a series of photos focusing on "untouched nature" with large-format cameras. He captured minute details of nature on extra large-size films (up to 8 × 20 inches). His works have been introduced internationally through several exhibitions and publications.

Amano gave lectures on his photographic expeditions and his experiences in nature around the world, and he advocated for the environmental importance of tree planting programs. He was a member of the Japan Professional Photographers Society, the Japan Advertising Photographers' Association, the International Environment Photographers Association, and the Society of Scientific Photography.

G8 Hokkaido Toyako Summit
Two landscape photos of Takashi Amano were displayed at the 34th G8 summit Working Lunch / Outreach Working Session of Hokkaido Toyako Summit held July 7–9, 2008. The photos of a cedar forest on Sado Island taken with an 8 × 20-inch large format camera were exhibited on the 4 × 1.5 m panels.

Bibliography

Exhibitions

References

External links
 AmanoTakashi.net – official website
 Aqua Design Amano Website
 News release about G8 Summit

Japanese designers
Fishkeeping
Japanese photographers
1954 births
2015 deaths